Crush is a brand of carbonated soft drinks owned and marketed internationally by  Keurig Dr Pepper, originally created as an orange soda, Orange Crush. Crush competes with Coca-Cola's Fanta. It was created in 1911 by beverage and extract chemist Neil C. Ward. Most flavors of Crush are caffeine-free.

History

In 1911, Clayton J. Howel, president and founder of the Orange Crush Company, partnered with Neil C. Ward and incorporated the company. Ward made the recipe for Orange Crush. Howel was not new to the soft drink business, having earlier introduced Howel's Orange Julep. Soft drinks of the time often carried the surname of the inventor along with the product name. Howel sold the rights to use his name in conjunction with his first brand; therefore, Ward was given the honours: Crush was first premiered as Ward's Orange Crush. Originally, Orange Crush included orange pulp in the bottles, giving it a "fresh squeezed" illusion, even though the pulp was added rather than remaining from squeezed oranges. Pulp has not been in the bottles for decades.

Crush was purchased by Procter & Gamble in 1980 (with the exception of the Canadian rights, which were purchased in 1984). Procter & Gamble only manufactured "bottler's base", which was a concentrate consisting of flavour and colour. One milliliter of bottler's base was combined with syrup and carbonated water to create a 12-ounce bottle of Crush. In 1989, Cadbury Schweppes acquired Crush USA from Procter & Gamble Co. Cadbury Schweppes spun off its United States beverage business as Dr Pepper Snapple Group (predecessor of Keurig Dr Pepper) in 2008.

Bottles were originally ribbed, and were made of brown glass at one point.

Today
The Crush brand and trademark are currently owned by Keurig Dr Pepper of Plano, Texas. Crush is also popular in Canada, where it is distributed by a subsidiary of Canada Dry Motts. It is distributed by various Pepsi bottlers, the biggest being the Pepsi Bottling Group United States.

Other countries where Crush is sold are Argentina, Colombia, Chile, Guatemala, Mexico, Panama, Paraguay, Peru, Syria, Uruguay and at one time Nicaragua, Costa Rica, Ecuador and Bolivia. In Chile, Crush has been distributed by Compañía de Cervecerías Unidas since the 1940s. In contrast, in some countries of Latin America the Crush brand is distributed by The Coca-Cola Company, using the same colours and bottles as Fanta.

Several flavours (Orange, Diet Orange, Grape, Strawberry, Cherry) are available at most stores throughout North America; others, however, are distributed only within small markets. Pineapple Crush and Birch Beer Crush, for instance, are found in both cans and single serving bottles in the Canadian province of Newfoundland and Labrador and in Fort McMurray, Alberta. From 2009, changes in bottling rights allowed many of these regional flavours to be distributed by the Pepsi Bottling Group in a majority of their territory in the United States, and for PepsiAmerica to distribute Crush in most of its territory.

Flavors

 Cocoa Crush
 Crush Apple
 Crush Banana
 Crush Berry Blast
 Crush Berry Punch
 Crush Berry Pomegranate
 Crush Birch Beer (Newfoundland, also available at some Sobeys grocery chains across Canada)
 Crush Blue Raspberry
 Crush Bubblegum (Slush only)
 Crush Cherry (2009–)
 Crush Chocolate
 Crush Cola (Kuwait, 1970s–1990s)
 Crush Cream Soda (Canada and UK); sold clear in Québec, and Newfoundland and Labrador; sold pink in the rest of Canada
 Crush Frozen Orange Dream
 Crush Tropical Punch
 Crush Fruity Red
 Crush Fruit Punch
 Crush Ginger Beer
 Crush Grapefruit
 Crush Grape
 Crush Lemon
 Crush Lemonade
 Crush Lemon-Lime
 Crush Lime
 Crush Lime Rickey
 Crush Nectar
 Crush Orange
 Crush Orange Dry
 Crush Peach
 Crush Peach Sour
 Crush Pear
 Crush Pineapple (Originally sold only in Newfoundland)
 Crush Pink Grapefruit
 Crush Red Cream
 Crush Red Licorice
 Crush Root Beer
 Crush Sarsi
 Crush Soda Water (Kuwait, 1970s–1990s)
 Crush Sour Apple (briefly offered in 2005)
 Crush Spruce Beer
 Crush Strawberries 'n' Cream
 Crush Strawberry
 Crush Strawberry Lemonade
 Crush Tuti-Fruti
 Crush Wild Cherry Cola
 Crush Watermelon
 Diet Crush Apple
 Diet Crush Cream Soda
 Diet Crush Grape
 Diet Crush Lime
 Orange Crush Light (in Chile)
 Diet Crush Orange

See also

References

External links

 
 Keurig Dr Pepper's Crush page

Products introduced in 1911
Keurig Dr Pepper brands
Orange sodas
Fruit sodas